Scaevola brookeana, or heart-leaved fan-flower, is a shrub in the family Goodeniaceae, native to Western Australia. It grows to between 0.2 and 0.7 metres high and produces white or blue flowers from August to December in its native range. The species was formally described by Victorian Government Botanist Ferdinand von Mueller in the tenth volume of Fragmenta Phytographiae Australiae based on plant material collected by Sarah Brooks, after whom it is named.

References

brookeana
Plants described in 1884
Taxa named by Ferdinand von Mueller